USS Samar may refer to:

, was launched 1887 for Spanish navy, captured during Spanish–American War and taken into service with the US Navy, decommissioned 6 September 1920
, was launched 19 October 1944 and struck from the naval register 1 September 1962

United States Navy ship names